Darren Callahan is a critically acclaimed Los Angeles-based film director, playwright, novelist, screenwriter and musician whose primary works include the novels The Audrey Green Chronicles and City of Human Remains, the stage plays The White Airplane, Horror Academy, Desperate Dolls, and Beautiful Women in Terrible Trouble, the films Under the Table and Children of the Invisible Man, the 24-volume set The Collected Screenplays of Darren Callahan (published by Battery Filmtext), and the 12-album discography of TRAVEL, a noise rock band featuring poet Matt Hart.

His work has been reviewed and he has been interviewed in the Chicago Tribune, Chicago Reader, Dayton Daily News, Time Out, Chicago Examiner, Daily Herald, Metromix, and the Chicago Sun-Times, and others.

His plays have been produced by Chicago's Strawdog Theatre, Babes With Blades, Polarity Ensemble Theatre, Chicago Dramatists, Breadline Theatre, Stage 773, PROP THTR, and City Lit. Chicago Reader named him Critics Choice for his novel The Vanishing of Archie Gray (2004).

He is the author of several produced radio dramas, including Uncle Ant (1997), The Death Guard (2000), The Tokyo Tourist Bureau (2005), The Wave (1998), and Carnival of Spies (2001) as well as the audio book The 30 Day Baby Company.  He is winner of the NPR Best Audio Drama Award.

He is president and founder of Phantom Soundtracks, a U.S.-based recording company. Releases include The White Airplane (2009), Spikes (2010), Alien Terrain (2011), North Point (2012), Chrysalis (later releases as Battle Apocalypse) (2014) and Cry It Out (2017), American Barbarian (2018), LVRS (2018), and All The Flowers That Cut Through The Earth (2018).  The label has released scores by Darren Callahan, Demetri Fox, Christopher LaPorte, Eric Leonardson, and others.

Notable 2010-2019 
In 2012, he wrote, directed, and composed the score for Glass City Films' production of Under the Table, a horror movie.  The film played several festivals and led to other assignments as a director, including Death & Devils, Children of the Invisible Man, Don't Call Me Loretta, and Desperate Dolls (film version).

In 2014, his stage play Desperate Dolls was produced and caused a significant controversy due to the violent and sexual content.  The play was reviewed by the Chicago Tribune,Chicago Reader,Windy City Times, Gapers Block,Stage and Cinema, LA Splash Magazine, and The Independent.

In 2015, he produced the film Chat Room, directed by Emily Bennett.  That year also saw the re-release of 1993's debut album from his pop band, OO OO WA, entitled Screen Kiss, as well as a release by Trouble Press of a collection of 31 fiction and non-fiction pieces, entitled Twin Cinema.

In 2017, Callahan scored the horror film Cry It Out, about haunted baby monitors, and contributed to articles about the legacy of David Bowie for The Federalist and other publications.  His screenplay All These Devils was named a finalist for Shriekfest, a Los Angeles horror film festival, where he had placed several scripts in the past.  Terror/13 was named a semi-finalist in the 2018-19 Shriekfest festival competition as well as the ScreenCraft competition; In Control was a semi-finalist for the latter as well.

In 2018, he scored the films LVRS (dir. Emily Bennett), All The Flowers That Cut Through The Earth (dir. Ward Crockett) and American Barbarian (dir. Paul Carr).  Also in 2018, Brazildisc released "Broken Punk Records: The Starfish Recordings," a 100-song box set of his band TRAVEL, as well as the re-issue of the 1986 industrial music album HUH? by DEMENTIA PRECOX, for which Callahan served as executive producer.

In 2019, Hooper Cinema Classics, a publisher specializing in entertainment-based releases, published a two-volume set of Callahan's work.  Devil Films (an omnibus edition of All These Devils, All These Demons, and All These Witches) and Sex Films (which includes Sexxina, All a Girl Can Get, and Pleasure Zone IV) capture six of his most popular screenplays. As well, his screenplay for In Control was a Top 10 finalist for the prestigious Page Awards.

Notable 2020- 
In 2020, Battery Filmtext of LA began publishing a multi-volume series highlighting Callahan's exploitation screenplays.  The set includes Documentia, Kiss Me with Blood, Red Park Road, Nerves, Weird Double Features (with Desperate Dolls and I Am An Agent), Summer of Ghosts, Afterschool Specials (with Scott Carson & Susan Rose, Turn Signals, Under the Table, and Lesbian Pornographic Feature Film), Terror/13, The Battle For Carlyle, All These Devils, Sexxina, Schoolgirl Sweethearts, Dead Stranger, 16MM Accident Film, Water Pressure, All A Girl Call Get, In Control, All These Demons, Salamander Lake, Pleasure Zone IV, All These Witches, Conventioneers, The Judy Solution, and The Airship.  Darren Callahan made an appearance on Horror Dads (Episode 6) in an extensive interview about his film score work.  This year also saw the release of Filmstrips -- a compilation of ambient film score selections from his last 10 years, plus Lost Valentines, a new demo/rarities compilation by OO OO WA, his 1990s pop band, featuring the brand new song "Smart Girls."  As well, 51Works of NYC released two volumes of his mid-2000 stage plays.  Archive: Early Works for Stage features The Double Negative, Filmstars, Throw the Control Darts, Two Girls Kissing, and Water Pressure, and another collection entitled Mad Scientist Double Feature, which includes two co-joined plays, Mass Grave and Sub-Genre.  Hudson & Hader also re-issued two previous novels in 2020 editions with new art, text, and design: 6 the Rise (2000, publ. 2012), and City of Human Remains (2008, publ. 2012).  He also was executive producer for several reissues by industrial band Dementia Precox.  He was also interviewed by the podcast Cinemental (Episodes 50 and 51) discussing David Cronenberg's Shivers and the giallo b-movie What Have You Done to Solange?

In 2021, Darren Callahan adapted the Brian Pinkerton thriller Rough Cut into a screenplay entitled Low-Budget Horror.  As well, he released his first non-soundtrack solo record in 8 years, When a Pill Becomes a Law, a 13-song collection featuring drummer Kelly Morelock (TRAVEL).  He was once again a guest on the podcast Cinemental, this time discussing the films Pontypool (2009) (Episode 81), The Crazies (1973) (Episode 82), Blood and Black Lace (1964) (Episode 112), and Kill, Baby... Kill! (1966) (Episode 113).  NPR's "Sound Affects" rebroadcast his 1997 audio drama Uncle Ant, a 30-minute horror/thriller. As well, Hooper Cinema Classics released The Fifth Terror, a collection of five feature-length horror screenplays: Demon Wasp, Old Cemetery, Kiss Me With Blood, Terror/13, and Mother Hospital. This edition was extended shortly thereafter to The Sixth Terror, with the additional screenplay of Dead Stranger.  Also released by Brazildisc is a four-volume singles collection featuring recordings from the late-1990s (Signal Flares & Indicator Lights, Town of Creeps, The Sinking Moon, and Burning Witches).  As well, Brazildisc re-released were two late-2000s EPs: the first was an expanded edition of The Globe Hotel by Callahan's electronica band Teenage Blackout; the second was Whiteout!!! by Callahan's noise band Travel.  Lastly, Plush Toy Records NYC released two ambient wallpaper LPs by Callahan's THE SAD COMEDIES, Soft Alarms and also Soviet Cinema.

In 2022, he produced several EPs and other releases for the Los Angeles all-female shoegaze band The Loud Bangs.

Musical Groups 
 DARREN CALLAHAN
 DJ POWDA
 ITALIAN AVIATION
 OO OO WA
 TEENAGE BLACKOUT
 TELEGRAPH
 THE DICTIONARY
 THE LIFE AND TIMES
 THE LOUD BANGS (PRODUCER/CO-WRITER)
 THE SAD COMEDIES
 TRAVEL

Novels 
 6 THE RISE
 CITY OF HUMAN REMAINS
 FOUR SEASONS IN ONE DAY (aka DEEP FREEZE)
 HOURS UNTIL WE SLEEP
 THE NUMBING OF AUDREY GREEN
 THE SEARCH FOR AUDREY GREEN
 THE TRAVELS OF AUDREY GREEN
 THE VANISHING OF ARCHIE GRAY
 UNSETTLED

Feature-Length Screenplays 
 16MM ACCIDENT FILM
 ALL A GIRL CAN GET
 ALL THESE DEMONS
 ALL THESE DEVILS
 ALL THESE WITCHES
 CONVENTIONEERS
 DEAD STRANGER
 DEMON WASP
 DESPERATE DOLLS
 DOCTOR MORTEER MEETS THE PROFESSOR
 DOCUMENTIA
 (TOP SECRET HALLOWEEN FRANCHISE FILM)
 HORRORTHON
 I AM AN AGENT
 IN CONTROL
 KISS ME WITH BLOOD
 LESBIAN PORNOGRAPHIC FEATURE FILM
 LOW-BUDGET HORROR (film adaptation of the novel ROUGH CUT by Brian Pinkerton)
 MOTHER HOSPITAL
 NERVES
 NIHILISTS
 OLD CEMETERY
 PLEASURE ZONE IV
 RED PARK ROAD
 SALAMANDAR LAKE
 SEXXINA
 SCHOOLGIRL SWEETHEARTS
 SUMMER OF GHOSTS
 TERROR/13
 TOGETHER ALONE (with Mark Davidov)
 THE AIRSHIP
 THE BATTLE FOR CARLYLE
 THE JUDY SOLUTION
 THE NIGHTMARE FACTORY
 WATER PRESSURE

Films 
 CHILDREN OF THE INVISIBLE MAN
 DESPERATE DOLLS
 UNDER THE TABLE

Stage Plays 
 CASTLE VON DEATH (SHORT)
 DESPERATE DOLLS (BEAUTIFUL WOMEN IN TERRIBLE TROUBLE, PART TWO)
 HORROR ACADEMY
 KILL YOUR ENEMIES
 MASS GRAVE
 SUB-GENRE
 SOURCES (BEAUTIFUL WOMEN IN TERRIBLE TROUBLE, PART THREE)
 THE DOUBLE NEGATIVE
 THE ESSENTIALS (SHORT)
 THE WHITE AIRPLANE
 THROW THE CONTROL DARTS
 TWO GIRLS KISSING
 UNDER THE TABLE (SHORT)
 WATER PRESSURE
 WITNESS TO AN ACCIDENT (BEAUTIFUL WOMEN IN TERRIBLE TROUBLE, PART ONE)

Original Scores 
 AFTER HOURS
 ALIEN TERRAIN (as Demetri Fox)
 ALL THE FLOWERS THAT CUT THROUGH THE EARTH
 AMERICAN BARBARIAN
 CHRYSALIS (aka BATTLE APOCALYPSE)
 CRY IT OUT
 LVRS
 PRAY WITH US
 SPIKES
 UNDER THE TABLE

References

External links 
 Horror Dads (Podcast Interview) Episode 6: Horror Film Scores & Interview With Composer Darren Callahan by Horror Dads • A podcast on Anchor
 Cinemental (Podcast Interviews - Six Episodes)  
 Cinema Apocalypse (Podcast Interview)  
 Dayton Daily News (May 2020) 
 Shriekfest Radio (Podcast Interview) Shriekfest Radio
 Shriekfest (profile) Shriekfest Interview
 Primary Website DarrenCallahan.com
 Internet Movie Database 
 Desperate Dolls Review Theatre In Chicago
 MSN interview 
 Dayton Daily News (July 2020) 
 Go! Magazine (June 2021) 
 Amazon 

Writers from Chicago
American dramatists and playwrights
American screenwriters
Living people
Year of birth missing (living people)